is a 1929 Japanese silent drama film directed by Kenji Mizoguchi. It is one of the left-leaning "tendency films" Mizoguchi made in the late 1920s. Only a fragment of the film exists today.

Plot
Michiyo, an orphan and factory working girl, lives with her labourer uncle and his wife in Tokyo. When he loses his job, they decide to sell her as a geisha. In a dream, Michiyo remembers her deceased mother, a geisha who was in love with a customer who left her after Michiyo's birth. Yoshiki and Sakuma, sons of upper-class families, spot Michiyo in the backyard of her uncle's house and both fall in love with her. Some time later, Michiyo has become a geisha and is now working under the name of Orie. Yoshiki's father, businessman Fujimoto, has developed a crush on Orie, but seeing the ring on her finger which she received from her mother, he realises that she is his daughter whom he once left behind. Yoshiki, who competed with Sakuma for Orie's love, is devastated to learn that she is his sister. Sakuma and Orie marry, while Yoshiki sets forth on a journey to forget.

Cast
 Shizue Natsukawa as Michiyo/Orie
 Reiji Ichiki as Yoshiki
 Isamu Kosugi as Sakuma
 Eiji Takagi as Fujimoto
 Takako Irie as Sayuriko

Background
The success of the 1929 song "Tōkyō kōshinkyoku", sung by Chiyako Satō, led to the composure of a serialised novel by Hiroshi Kikuchi, the production of Mizoguchi's film by the Nikkatsu studio (while the novel was still unfinished), and even a stage play. Originally planned as a part-talkie with sound interludes containing music, the film was eventually released as a complete silent film. Similar to Mizoguchi's Metropolitan Symphony (Tokai kokyōkyoku), Tokyo March presented love as the link between members of the proletariat and the upper class.

Home media
A 24-minute-long fragment of the film has been published on DVD as complement to Mizoguchi's The Water Magician by Digital MEME in 2007.

References

External links
 

1929 films
Films directed by Kenji Mizoguchi
Films shot in Tokyo
Japanese black-and-white films
Japanese drama films
1929 drama films
Melodrama films
Japanese silent films
Silent drama films
Films based on Japanese novels